Husayn al-Shami is a Shia Lebanese and also the head of Bayt al-Mal and a senior Hezbollah leader who has served as a member of Hezbollah's Shura Council and as the head of several Hezbollah-controlled organizations, including the Islamic Resistance Support Organization.  Shami is also responsible for foreign donations to Hezbollah fundraising organizations.

References

Year of birth missing (living people)
Living people
Lebanese Islamists
Lebanese Shia Muslims
Hezbollah politicians